Łukasz de Bnin Opaliński of Łodzia coat of arms (1581–1654) was a Polish nobleman.

He was castellan of Poznań from 1615, Court Marshal of the Crown from 1622 (or 1630), Grand Marshal of the Crown in 1634–1650, voivode of the Rawa Voivodeship, starost wałecki, leżajski, hrubieszowski, kolski, odolanowski, śremski, łosicki, ratneński, ujski and pilski. He was an enemy of Stanisław Stadnicki.

In 1620 when Michał Piekarski tried to attack king Sigismund III Vasa, Opaliński threw himself between them, saving the king.

He was a supporter and trusted retainer of King Władysław IV Vasa, considered efficient and just. At the same time he was merciless in exploiting the crown lands he was entrusted as a starost.

He had three wives, Anna Pilecka, Zofia Daniłowicz and Elżbieta Firlej. He had two children with Pilecka, Elżbieta Opalińska and Konstancja Opalińska, as well as one child with Daniłowicz, Katarzyna Opalińska.

Founder of basilica in Leżajsk.

Lukasz Opalinski (1581-1654)
Starost of Leżajsk
1581 births
1654 deaths